Saint Francis de Sales Seminary is a seminary for the Roman Catholic Archdiocese of Milwaukee, located in the Milwaukee suburb of St. Francis, Wisconsin. Its main building, called Henni Hall, is listed on the National Register of Historic Places.

Dedication 
The seminary was dedicated to Francis de Sales, seventeenth-century Bishop and saint of the Roman Catholic Church.

History 
The seminary was founded in 1845 in the home of Archbishop John Henni, two years after the Archdiocese was established in Milwaukee. It is one of the original Roman Catholic seminaries in the United States and the oldest in continuous existence.  It was founded to meet the demand for German-speaking priests in the Wisconsin Territory.

Henni Hall was dedicated on January 29, 1856 after a new location was chosen for the seminary along the south shore of Lake Township. The building was 4.5 stories tall, Italianate-styled, with a U-shaped floor plan. The gingerbread ornamentation was added at a later date. It was expanded in 1868 and again in 1875, and later renovated in 1989. Christ King Chapel within Henni Hall was consecrated in June 1861 by Archbishop Henni. Archbishop Michael Heiss and Fr. Joseph Salzmann, the first two rectors, are buried beneath the chapel.  The seminary's Salzmann Library was erected in 1908 and now contains more than 89,000 volumes.  The Miller Gymnasium, a gift from the estate of Ernest G. Miller, was dedicated in 1927.

Over the past 170 years, Saint Francis de Sales Seminary has graduated over 4,000 priests and over 400 deacons and lay ministers. Until 1941, it had included a minor seminary component, but in that year those students were merged with the students at Pio Nino High School to form the new St. Francis de Sales Preparatory Seminary. Since 2006, the seminary once again focuses solely on priestly formation.

Church land accounts for a significant portion of the City of St. Francis. On the grounds of Saint Francis de Sales Seminary is a large undeveloped area known as the Seminary Woods which hosts a small cemetery and grotto honoring Our Lady of Lourdes. Archbishop Frederick Xavier Katzer is also buried here.

Forty-nine tall maple trees line the long road that leads up to Saint Francis de Sales Seminary. Planted by Austrian immigrant Siegfried Wegerbauer in the 1930s, their canopy now forms cathedral arches shading the path.

Our Lady of Lourdes Grotto 

The Our Lady of Lourdes Grotto was built by German born Paul Dobberstein while training at the seminary in 1894. During his studies he contracted double pneumonia and promised the Blessed Virgin Mary he would build a grotto in her honor, once he recovered. This monument can be found in Saint Francis de Sales Seminary's wooded area.  It is free for anyone to view.

Standing a mere ten feet tall, this grotto was Dobberstein's first attempt at grotto building. He used the knowledge and skills gained during its construction to build other grottos in Wisconsin and Iowa, including the massive Grotto of the Redemption found in West Bend, Iowa. It is believed to have inspired Mathias Wernerus (who also attended Saint Francis de Sales Seminary) to build the Dickeyville Grotto in Dickeyville, Wisconsin in 1930 and started the grotto building movement in America.

Notable alumni
Dismas Becker – Wisconsin legislator and civil rights activist
Fabian Bruskewitz – Bishop of the Roman Catholic Diocese of Lincoln
Solanus Casey – Blessed priest
Edward Joseph Dunne – Bishop of the Roman Catholic Diocese of Dallas
Mariano Simon Garriga – Bishop of the Roman Catholic Diocese of Corpus Christi
Augustus F. Gearhard – Deputy Chief of Chaplains of the U.S. Air Force
Daniel Mary Gorman – Bishop of the Roman Catholic Diocese of Boise
James Groppi – Civil rights leader, Roman Catholic Archdiocese of Milwaukee
Francis J. Haas – Bishop of the Roman Catholic Diocese of Grand Rapids
Jeffrey Haines – Auxiliary Bishop of the Roman Catholic Archdiocese of Milwaukee
James Michael Harvey – Cardinal
John Joseph Hennessy – Bishop of the Roman Catholic Diocese of Wichita
Donald J. Hying – Bishop of the Roman Catholic Diocese of Gary
Francis Johannes – Bishop of the Roman Catholic Diocese of Leavenworth
Frederick Katzer – Bishop of the Roman Catholic Diocese of Green Bay
Bernard B. Kroenke – Wisconsin legislator
John Jeremiah Lawler – Bishop of the Roman Catholic Diocese of Rapid City
Francis Peter Leipzig – Bishop of the Roman Catholic Diocese of Baker
Thomas Mathias Lenihan – Bishop of the Roman Catholic Diocese of Cheyenne
Joseph Patrick Lynch – Bishop of the Roman Catholic Diocese of Dallas
Aloisius Joseph Muench – Cardinal
Thomas Lawrence Noa – Bishop of the Roman Catholic Diocese of Marquette
Joseph Perry – Auxiliary Bishop of Roman Catholic Archdiocese of Chicago
Paul Peter Rhode – Bishop of the Roman Catholic Diocese of Green Bay
Vincent James Ryan – Bishop of the Roman Catholic Diocese of Bismarck
James T. Schuerman – Auxiliary Bishop of the Roman Catholic Archdiocese of Milwaukee.
Augustine Francis Schinner – Bishop of the Roman Catholic Diocese of Superior
Thomas Seery – Wisconsin legislator
Richard J. Sklba – Auxiliary Bishop of the Roman Catholic Archdiocese of Milwaukee
Paul Francis Tanner – Bishop of the Roman Catholic Diocese of St. Augustine
John Henry Tihen – Bishop of the Roman Catholic Archdiocese of Denver
Charles Daniel White – Bishop of the Roman Catholic Diocese of Spokane
Paul Ssemogerere - Bishop of the Roman Catholic Diocese of Kasana-Luweero, in Uganda

Notes

External links 

Official website

Buildings and structures in Milwaukee County, Wisconsin
Educational institutions established in 1845
Education in Milwaukee County, Wisconsin
Grottoes
Churches on the National Register of Historic Places in Wisconsin
Roman Catholic Archdiocese of Milwaukee
Catholic Church in Wisconsin
Catholic seminaries in the United States
Seminaries and theological colleges in Wisconsin
Catholic universities and colleges in Wisconsin
Tourist attractions in Milwaukee County, Wisconsin
National Register of Historic Places in Milwaukee County, Wisconsin
1845 establishments in Wisconsin Territory